Emanuil A. Vidinski (born June 1978 in Vidin, Bulgaria) is a Bulgarian writer, poet, and musician.

He has published his works in several Bulgarian newspapers (Culture, Literary Newspaper, Capital Light), magazines, and literature web portals (liternet.bg , slovo.bg , grosnipelikani.net ). He co-founded the humanistic seminar "Angle" (2003–2004) .

Emanuil A. Vidinski authored the collection of short stories Cartographies of Escape (2005) which was among the six shortlisted books for the Elias Canetti Award (2005) and the novel Places to Breathe (2008). He won the Rashko Sugarev Award in 2004 for his short story “4th of October" and the "Balkani Award" in 2009 for his short story "Egon and the silence".

During 2005–2006 he wrote a music column entitled "Musaic" for the Literary Newspaper. In 2004, he and poets Petar Tchouhov and Ivan Hristov established the ethno-rock poetry band Gologan.

His works have been translated into English, German, Hungarian, Croatian and Spanish.

Bibliography 
 Cartographies of Escape (2005) - selection of short stories, published by Stigmati Publishing House, Bulgaria.
 Places to Breathe (2008) - a novel, published by Altera Publishers, Bulgaria.
 Par Avion (2011) - poems, published by Janet 45 Publishers, Bulgaria.

External links 
http://liternet.bg/publish9/eavidinski/index.html Selection of works (in Bulgarian)
http://www.slovo.bg/showauthor.php3?ID=378&LangID=1 From Cartographies of escape (in Bulgarian)
http://www.gologan.net Website of ethno-rock poetry band Gologan

21st-century Bulgarian poets
Bulgarian male poets
People from Vidin
Living people
1978 births